The 2009 European Team Championships Super League was the Super League of the 1st edition of the European Team Championships (European Athletics Team Championships from 2013 edition), the 2009 European Team Championships, which took place on 20 and 21 June 2009 in Leiria, Portugal. A couple of rules were introduced applying specifically to this competition, some of which were discarded or altered for the subsequent editions. See the main article for more details.

Final standings

Men's results

100 metres
June 20

Wind:Heat A: -0.3 m/s, Heat B: +0.2 m/s

200 metres
June 21

Wind:Heat A: -0.4 m/s, Heat B: -0.9 m/s

400 metres
June 20

800 metres
June 21

1500 metres
June 20

3000 metres
June 21

5000 metres
June 20

3000 metres steeplechase
June 21

110 metres hurdles
June 21

Wind:Heat A: +0.4 m/s, Heat B: +1.3 m/s

400 metres hurdles
June 20

4 × 100 metres relay 
June 20

4 × 400 metres relay 
June 21

High jump
June 20

Pole vault
June 21

Long jump
June 20

Triple jump
June 21

Shot put
June 20

Discus throw
June 21

Hammer throw
June 20

Javelin throw
June 21

Women's results

100 metres
June 20

Wind:Heat A: +1.1 m/s, Heat B: +0.6 m/s

200 metres
June 21

Wind:Heat A: -0.4 m/s, Heat B: 0.0 m/s

400 metres
June 20

800 metres
June 20

1500 metres
June 21

3000 metres
June 20

5000 metres
June 21

3000 metres steeplechase
June 20

100 metres hurdles
June 21

Wind:Heat A: +0.3 m/s, Heat B: +0.6 m/s

400 metres hurdles
June 20

4 × 100 metres relay 
June 20

4 × 400 metres relay 
June 21

High jump
June 21

Pole vault
June 20

Long jump
June 21

Triple jump
June 20

Shot put
June 21

Discus throw
June 20

Hammer throw
June 21

Javelin throw
June 20 Than the new ranking after IAAF decision for doping disqualification.

References

External links
Full results (archived)

European Athletics Team Championships Super League
European
2009 in Portuguese sport
International athletics competitions hosted by Portugal
Sport in Leiria